Snow baseball is a winter sports refers to Baseball played on snow. It can be played on snow or frost either with Snowshoe or with Ski. 

The sport is very much popular in India during winter season but mostly played in Kashmir region and in the states of Uttarakhand and Himachal Pradesh. However the sport is also much popular in state like Rajasthan.

The sports became an event in Khelo India Winter Games. Where J&K and Uttarakhand has won gold medals in men's and women's teams events respectively.

The organizing committee of the sport was Baseball Association of Jammu and Kashmir under Jammu and Kashmir Sports Council.

History 
Due to heavy snow in Kashmir valley in winters, it is impossible to play Baseball in outdoors. As an alternative of Baseball field it has started being played on snow.

References 

Baseball genres
Baseball in India